Semgamakhi (Dargwa: Семгамахьи) is a rural locality (a selo) in Akushinsky Selsoviet, Akushinsky District, Republic of Dagestan, Russia. The population was 668 as of 2010. There are 21 streets.

Geography 
Semgamakhi is located 2 km northeast of Akusha (the district's administrative centre) by road. Akusha is the nearest rural locality.

References 

Rural localities in Akushinsky District